Rick Lax (born April 17, 1982) is an American author, entertainer, and magician.

Early life and education
Born in Detroit, Lax's interest in magic began at age 5, inspired by David Copperfield. After attending Michigan State University and the University of Michigan, he earned a law degree from DePaul University. In 2008, he published a novel about a talented young magician's experiences in law school.

Career
Lax was a friend and the first manager of rock band Tally Hall, beginning in 2004. He also appeared in videos by the band.

From 2011 to 2013, Lax worked as a behind-the-scenes consultant for Copperfield and wrote two books about Las Vegas. He also created the TV show Wizard Wars, which aired for two seasons on the Syfy network in 2014.

In 2015, Lax competed on The CW's Penn & Teller: Fool Us. He performed an original card trick called Binary Code, and was the only contestant to fool Penn & Teller during the episode.

Lax continues to work as a show producer and behind-the-scenes magic consultant.

In 2015, Lax started releasing videos on Facebook. By 2019, he was gaining more than a billion views every month. Also that year, Lax launched Making Magic, which features Lax interviewing fellow magicians.

By October 2020, Lax's Facebook page had the second highest reach on the entire Facebook platform. Tubular Audience Ratings continues to show Lax as a platform leader.

Publications

References

External links 

 Official website

1982 births
21st-century American Jews
DePaul University College of Law alumni
Jewish American entertainers
Jewish American writers
Living people
University of Michigan alumni